This is a list of Croatian television related events from 1965.

Births
17 November - Goran Grgić, actor

Deaths